The town of Aundh is situated 26 mi. S.E. of Satara. Population (in 2011) about 3500, home of the Aundh State, a princely state (1699–1947). It is now part of Satara District in Maharashtra State.

The town is known for its  very old hill temple of  the Devi Yamai. The  Devi Yamai is the kuldaiwat of many Marathi families. The top of the temple has images and idols of various Hindu Gods. The temple complex also contains the  "Shri Bhavani Museum". The present head of the former ruling family, Gayatridevi Pantpratinidhi has installed a 7 kg golden 'Kalash' or crown on the pinnacle of the Yamai temple on the hill at Aundh.

Another temple of Devi Yamai is located in the town; apart from the one on the hill.

The Yamai temple holds an annual fair (Yatra) in honour of the goddess Yamai  on the Pournima (Full moon day) in the Shaka month of Paush ( mid January). The yatra attracts thousands of devotees. One of the attraction of the fair is the lighting of the giant stone lamp stand (Deepmal). The fair includes food vendors, vendors selling local novelties, talent shows and movies. 

The town falls under Satara District and has a Gram Panchayat (Parish council), with a member of the former ruling family serving as the Sarpanch (Head of the council).

Shri Bhavani Museum

This museum has the distinction of being one of the first art museum in India set up by an Indian as an Art Museum rather than as a museum of artefact. The museum contains art  collection that  was formerly  owned by Shri Bhawanrao  Pantapratinidhi, the last ruler of Aundh state. The museum collection includes paintings and sculptures of various well-known  artists including Raja Ravi Varma and the famous "Mother and Child" stone structure by Henry Moore. It also has various works of art by former alumni of the J.J. school of art such as M. V. Dhurandhar, and Madhav Satwalekar The museum also holds works from the Bengal school. The collection includes casts and copies of many popular western classical sculptures and paintings.
There is a small collection of Indian paintings from the pre-modern period especially of the Kangra or Pahadi style. The Aundh Raja Bhawanrao Shriniwasrao Pan Pratinidhi was a really very famous king for many social actions and also Surya Namaskar, he was also a great lover of art ans culture.

See also
 Aundh State
 Aundh Experiment

References

Cities and towns in Satara district
Satara (city)

ca:Aundh
fr:Aundh
mr:औंध संस्थान
nl:Aundh
sv:Aundh